Albert Clark Wedge (August 18m 1834 – October 23, 1911) was an American physician and politician.

Wedge was born in Denmark, Lewis County, New York. He went to the Wisconsin public schools and then went to Ripon College, in Ripon, Wisconsin, in 1854. In 1857, Wedge received his medical degree from Cleveland Medical College. He moved to Albert Lea, Minnesota with his wife and family and practiced medicine in Albert Lea. Wedge served in the 3rd Minnesota Infantry Regiment during the American Civil War. Wedge served as mayor of Albert Lew and was a Republican. He then served in the Minnesota House of Representatives in 1870 and 19771 and in the Minnesota Senate from 1879 to 1881.

References

1834 births
1911 deaths
People from Albert Lea, Minnesota
People from Lewis County, New York
People of Minnesota in the American Civil War
Case Western Reserve University alumni
Ripon College (Wisconsin) alumni
Physicians from Minnesota
Mayors of places in Minnesota
Republican Party members of the Minnesota House of Representatives
Republican Party Minnesota state senators